Paxtaobod District is a district of Andijan Region in Uzbekistan. It is bordered with Jalal-Abad Region of Kyrgyzstan. The capital lies at the city Paxtaobod.

The district consists of 1 city (Paxtaobod), 3 urban-type settlements (Do'stlik, Izboskan and Pushmon) and 4 rural communities.

The district formerly named as Qo'qonqishloq prior and during the Soviet. It is believed that people living in the region once came from Qo'qon (Kokand) so it is named as Qo'qonqishloq which directly translates as "the village of Kokan people".

References

Districts of Uzbekistan
Andijan Region